Gerrit Smith may refer to:
Gerrit Smith (1797 — 1874), United States social reformer, abolitionist, politician, and philanthropist. 
Gerrit Smith Estate, in Peterboro, New York, was the home of Gerrit Smith.
Gerrit Smith (rugby union), South African rugby union player.
 Gerrit Smith Miller (1845 – 1937), Gerrit Smith's grandson, a dairy farmer who introduced Holstein cattle to the U.S.
Gerrit Smith Miller Jr., (1869 – 1956), son of the previous, an American zoologist and botanist.

See also
Gerrit (disambiguation)